Ohio is a small community in the Canadian province of Nova Scotia, located in Antigonish, subd. A in Antigonish County.

References

Further reading

Communities in Antigonish County, Nova Scotia